Zethus spinipes is a species of stinging wasp in the family Vespidae.

Subspecies
These two subspecies belong to the species Zethus spinipes:
 Zethus spinipes spinipes g b
 Zethus spinipes variegatus de Saussure, 1852 g b
Data sources: i = ITIS, c = Catalogue of Life, g = GBIF, b = Bugguide.net

References

Further reading

External links

 

Vespidae
Insects described in 1837